Mark Harden Blandford (July 13, 1826 – January 31, 1902) was an American soldier, attorney, politician, and judge. He was a Member of the Confederate House of Representatives during the American Civil War.

Biography
Mark Blandford was born in Warren County, Georgia. He served in the United States Army during the Mexican–American War and in the Confederate States Army (12th Georgia Infantry Regiment) during the early part of the American Civil War. He represented Georgia in the Second Confederate Congress from 1864 to 1865.

After the war, he served as a justice of the Supreme Court of Georgia from 1883 to 1890. He died in Columbus, Georgia, January 31, 1902, and is buried in Linwood Cemetery, Columbus, Georgia.

References

Members of the Confederate House of Representatives from Georgia (U.S. state)
19th-century American politicians
Justices of the Supreme Court of Georgia (U.S. state)
American military personnel of the Mexican–American War
Confederate States Army officers
1826 births
1902 deaths
People from Warren County, Georgia
19th-century American judges